Perry Frances Garcia Mattfeld is an American actress and producer. She is best known for her roles as Mel in Shameless, FrankenGirl in Wizards of Waverly Place, and her leading role as Murphy Mason in The CW crime drama In the Dark.

Early life 
Mattfeld grew up in Long Beach, California. Her mother is of Mexican descent. Her grandparents and great-grandparents were entertainers.

Career 
Mattfeld began her career as a ballet dancer from the age of five and studied for the following nine years under the guidance of Debbie Allen. By the age of 12, she was a full-fledged employee of Mattel when she played Kirsten Larson and Kit Kittredge as part of Mattel's American Girl Dolls musical theater troupe. 

She stopped acting after graduating from Long Beach Poly high school to attend the University of Southern California School of Dramatic Arts where she earned a Bachelor of Fine Arts in acting in 2016.

In the Dark
In her first starring role, in The CW crime comedy-drama, In the Dark (2019–present), she plays a blind woman. For this part, she learned skills for coping with blindness such as using a guide dog and sending text messages with voice commands. She shadowed a blind person, on whose life the show is based, to observe how she did ordinary things. Fans have reportedly believed that she was blind herself. Although the show has received criticism for not using an actual blind actress, the producer says she was "best for the role" despite having auditioned  blind actresses.

Personal life 
Mattfeld and former New York Jets quarterback Mark Sanchez got engaged in May 2022.

Filmography

Film

Television

References

External links 
 Perry Mattfeld on IMDB

Living people
21st-century American actresses
American child actresses
American film actresses
American television actresses
Year of birth missing (living people)
Long Beach Polytechnic High School alumni
Actresses from Long Beach, California
American actresses of Mexican descent
USC School of Dramatic Arts alumni